Frank Lasee (born December 11, 1961) is an American politician and former Republican member of the Wisconsin State Senate. He represented the 1st Senate District from 2011 until 2017, succeeding his cousin, Alan Lasee. Lasee previously served in the Wisconsin State Assembly, representing the 2nd Assembly District from 1995 to 2009.

Early life, education, and early career 

Born in Oceanside, California, to a Marine Corps officer stationed at Camp Pendleton on December 11, 1961, and subsequently raised in Green Bay and De Pere, Lasee graduated in 1986 from the University of Wisconsin–Green Bay with a major in history. He is married and the father of six daughters.

Prior to his election to the State Assembly in 1994, Lasee was the Ledgeview Town Board Chair from 1993 to 1997, and was a telemarketing supervisor for an insurance company.

Wisconsin legislature

Elections

2008 

Lasee lost his bid for an eighth term representing the 2nd Assembly District to Democrat Ted Zigmunt on November 4, 2008. Lasee blamed his defeat on the Wisconsin Education Association Council, the state's largest teachers' union, claiming they spent $250,000 on campaign ads.

2010 

Frank's older cousin, Alan Lasee, announced his retirement from the Wisconsin Legislature on January 11, 2010. Frank Lasee competed with Democrat Monk Elmer for his cousin's old seat in the 2010 campaign, ultimately prevailing by twenty percentage points.

2014 

In June 2014, the Democratic Party of Wisconsin filed a complaint with the Government Accountability Board alleging that Lasee was living outside of his district. The Party contended that while Lasee listed a town of Ledgeview address on his candidacy papers, he was actually living with his wife and children in Racine, which is outside of the 1st Senate District. The Government Accountability Board ultimately ruled to allow Lasee to stay on the ballot and leave the issue up to the voters.

Frank Lasee was challenged by Democrat Dean DeBroux in the general election, and prevailed by over twenty percentage points.

Tenure
Lasee was a member of the State Assembly who dissented on many issues, including state budgets.  He was called an advocate of taxpayers, limited spending and an opponent of tax increases. He was elected seven times.

Some of his most notable proposals are as follows.

Taxpayer Protection Act
A 2006 proposal was the "Taxpayer Protection Act". The TPA proposed to tie governments revenue to inflation, population, personal income growth etc.

Taxpayers Bill of Rights
A Taxpayers Bill of Rights, also known as TABOR, was introduced by Frank Lasee and Jeffrey Wood in 2004 in Wisconsin. They stated "taxpayers in this state need protection". TABOR includes five basic provisions:
Limit state and school spending growth to population growth plus inflation.
Limit county and municipalities the same way.
Any increase in income, sales, franchise, or property tax rates, would require the approval of voters.
Any proposal by the state or local governments to borrow money would require the approval of voters.
Establish an emergency fund and budget stabilization fund.

Consumer’s Choice in Auto Insurance Act
Lasee authored Senate Bill 7, the companion bill to Assembly Bill 4 was later passed the legislature. AB4 lowered the cost of insurance by eliminating the stacking clause.

Committee assignments
Senate Standing Committees
Committee on Financial Institutions and Rural Issues
Committee on Insurance and Housing (Chair)
Committee on State and Federal Relations and Information Technology
Committee on Transportation and Elections

Joint Committees
Joint Survey Committee on Tax Exemptions (Co-Chair)
Joint Legislative Council
Governor's Commission on Waste, Fraud and Abuse

2012 U.S. Senate election

In September 2011, he announced he would run for the U.S. Senate seat vacated by retiring Democratic U.S. Senator Herb Kohl. On January 29, 2012 he announced his withdrawal from the U.S. Senate race.

2016 U.S. House of Representatives election

On February 14, 2016, Lasee announced he would run for the U.S. House seat being vacated by retiring Rep. Reid Ribble. He lost to eventual general election winner Mike Gallagher in the primary.

On December 29, 2017, Lasee resigned from the Senate to become administrator of the Wisconsin Department of Workforce Development's Worker's Compensation Division.

Heartland Institute
In 2019, Lasee became president of The Heartland Institute, an American conservative and libertarian public policy think tank. He was removed in March 2020, with the organization facing financial issues.

Personal life
Lasee is currently married to Amy Joy Lasee. They have six daughters and one son.  He was previously married to Kirsten Lasee, with whom he had two children;  they divorced in 2001.

Electoral history

References

External links
Profile, committees and bills at the Wisconsin State Legislature
Frank Lasee official campaign site
 

|-

Living people
1961 births
People from Oceanside, California
People from De Pere, Wisconsin
University of Wisconsin–Green Bay alumni
Democratic Party Wisconsin state senators
Democratic Party members of the Wisconsin State Assembly
21st-century American politicians
Politicians from Green Bay, Wisconsin
People from Brown County, Wisconsin